The Piccolo Coro "Mariele Ventre" dell'Antoniano, until 1995 simply Piccolo Coro dell'Antoniano, is an Italian children's choir from Bologna.

History
The choir was created by Mariele Ventre in 1963 at the Antoniano Institute for children to sing together at the Zecchino d'Oro festival, started only five years earlier. In the very beginning there were few kids in the choir but it changed very fast and the choir became much larger (up to about 80 children at some time).

In 1995, after Ventre's death the choir was taken by Sabrina Simoni and changed its name to Piccolo Coro "Mariele Ventre" dell' Antoniano in the founder's honor.

Since 22 November 2003 the children of the choir have been Italian Good Will Ambassadors.

External links

Piccolo Coro dell'Antoniano Official Homepage
Good Will Ambassadors
Unofficial Homepage
Official canal - Antoniano di Bologna (YouTube)

Choirs of children
Musical groups established in 1963